Julia Karin Ormond (born 4 January 1965) is an English actress. She rose to prominence by appearing in The Baby of Mâcon (1993), Legends of the Fall (1994), First Knight (1995), Sabrina (1995), Smilla's Sense of Snow (1997) and The Barber of Siberia (1998). She won an Emmy Award for Outstanding Supporting Actress in a Miniseries or a Movie, for her role in the HBO film Temple Grandin (2010). She is also known for her role in The Walking Dead: World Beyond (2020) as a main antagonist.

Early life
Ormond was born in Epsom, Surrey, the daughter of Josephine, a laboratory technician, and John Ormond, a stockbroker. She is the second of five children born to her parents. She attended private schools, first Guildford High School and then Cranleigh School, where early lead performances in Guys and Dolls and My Fair Lady began to draw attention.

After one year of art school, she transferred to Webber-Douglas Academy of Dramatic Art, where she graduated in 1988.

Career
Ormond first appeared on British television in the 1989 serial Traffik, about the illegal heroin trade from the far East to the streets of Europe. Ormond played the drug addicted daughter of the lead character, a Home Office minister in the UK government engaged in combating heroin importation. This early role won glowing reviews.

Ormond appeared in several television films early in her career, such as Young Catherine (1991) and Stalin (1992). In 1993, she made her film debut in the lead role of an international movie, The Baby of Mâcon, and the following year co-starred in Legends of the Fall.

In 1995, Ormond played Queen Guinevere in First Knight and the title role in Sabrina. In 1997, she played a lead role in the thriller Smilla's Sense of Snow and, in 1998, she starred in the Russian film The Barber of Siberia.

Since the late 1990s, Ormond has appeared in indie and television movies and played supporting roles in films such as Iron Jawed Angels (2004), The Curious Case of Benjamin Button (2008), Che: Part One (2008), Albatross (2011), and My Week with Marilyn (2011).

Ormond has an independent production company, Indican Productions, based in New York City, and she executive-produced the Cinemax Reel Life documentary Calling the Ghosts: A Story about Rape, War and Women, which won a CableACE Award and a Robert F. Kennedy Journalism Award, and was an official selection of the Toronto and Berlin International Film Festivals.

On stage, she appeared in David Hare's My Zinc Bed, for which she received a 2001 Olivier Award nomination for Best Actress. On television, Ormond appeared as a guest star during the 2008–09 season of the CBS series CSI: NY. In 2010, she won an Emmy Award for her supporting role in the television film Temple Grandin. In 2011, Ormond guest starred in the tenth and final season of the series Law & Order: Criminal Intent.

In 2012, she played the part of Marie Calvet, mother to Megan Draper, in the series Mad Men, for which she was nominated for the Primetime Emmy Award for Outstanding Guest Actress in a Drama Series. From 6 October 2013 to 5 October 2014, Ormond starred in the television series Witches of East End as Joanna Beauchamp, one of the lead characters. Since 2020, she has portrayed the primary antagonist, Elizabeth Kublek, in the AMC television series The Walking Dead: World Beyond.

Personal life
In 1988, Ormond married Rory Edwards, an actor she had met while performing in a production of Wuthering Heights. The marriage ended in 1994. In 1999, she married political activist Jon Rubin. The couple's daughter, Sophie, was born in the autumn of 2004. The couple divorced in 2008.

Ormond has been fighting human trafficking since the mid-1990s, and in 2006 she entered into a partnership with the United Nations Office on Drugs and Crime to redouble her efforts. She is also an advocate for Transatlantic Partners Against AIDS, which attempts to raise awareness about AIDS in Russia and Ukraine, and is founding co-chairman of FilmAid International.

On 2 December 2005, Ormond was appointed a United Nations Goodwill Ambassador. Her focus has been on anti-human-trafficking initiatives, raising awareness about this modern form of slavery and promoting efforts to combat it. In her capacity as ambassador, Ormond has appeared as counsel to the United States House of Representatives, Committee on International Relations, Subcommittee on Africa, Global Human Rights and International Operations, and has travelled the world as an ambassador.

In 2007, Ormond established the Alliance to Stop Slavery and End Trafficking (ASSET).

Filmography

Film

Television

Awards and nominations

References

External links

1965 births
20th-century English actresses
21st-century English actresses
Actresses from Surrey
Alumni of the Webber Douglas Academy of Dramatic Art
English activists
English women activists
English expatriates in the United States
English film actresses
English stage actresses
English television actresses
Living people
Outstanding Performance by a Supporting Actress in a Miniseries or Movie Primetime Emmy Award winners
People educated at Cranleigh School
People educated at Guildford High School
People from Epsom